William C. and Clara Hagerman House is a historic home located at Fort Wayne, Indiana.  It was built about 1923, and is a two-story, side gabled, American Craftsman style brick dwelling. The house features wide, overhanging eaves with decorative, exposed triangular braces and leaded glass and colored glass windows.  Also on the property is a contributing garage.

It was listed on the National Register of Historic Places in 2015.  It is located in the North Anthony Boulevard Historic District.

References

Houses on the National Register of Historic Places in Indiana
Houses completed in 1923
Houses in Fort Wayne, Indiana
National Register of Historic Places in Fort Wayne, Indiana
Historic district contributing properties in Indiana